Priest Lake USFS Airport  is a public use airport located three nautical miles (6 km) south of the central business district of Nordman, in Bonner County, Idaho, United States. It is owned by the United States Forest Service. The airport is located at the west side of Priest Lake.

Facilities and aircraft 
It has one runway designated 14/32 with a 4,400 x 175 ft (1,341 x 53 m) turf and gravel surface.

For the 12-month period ending May 23, 2007, the airport had 1,200 general aviation aircraft operations, and average of 100 per month.

See also 
 Cavanaugh Bay Airport
 Tanglefoot Seaplane Base

References

External links 
 Priest Lake USFS (67S) at Idaho Transportation Department
 

Airports in Idaho
Buildings and structures in Bonner County, Idaho
United States Forest Service
Transportation in Bonner County, Idaho